The North Anderson Historic District, located in Anderson, South Carolina. The historic district is an architecturally significant area that offers an impressive collection of 20th century Revivals and American Movements. Further, the district is noteworthy for it further represents the development and transition of Anderson from a rural community to a planned city with well-thought out streets and neighborhoods. The district consists of over 147 homes, a number of garages and a few parks. Architectural styles include early twentieth century Revival styles including Tudor, Colonial, and Neo-Classical. The district was listed in the National Register of Historic Places on July 31, 2008.

References

Historic districts on the National Register of Historic Places in South Carolina
Buildings and structures in Anderson County, South Carolina
National Register of Historic Places in Anderson County, South Carolina